In molecular biology mir-22 microRNA is a short RNA molecule. MicroRNAs are an abundant class of molecules, approximately 22 nucleotides in length, which can post-transcriptionally regulate gene expression by binding to the 3' UTR of mRNAs expressed in a cell.

Origins 
Mir-22 was originally identified in HeLa cells (an immortal cell line derived from cervical cancer cells), but was later found to be ubiquitously expressed in various tissues. The gene encoding miR-22 is found on the short arm of chromosome 17, in a minimal loss of heterozygosity region.  It is highly conserved across many vertebrate species, including chimp, mouse, rat, dog and horse.  This level of conservation suggests functional importance.  MiR-22 was previously identified as having a role in erythrocyte maturation.

Role in cancer 
The deregulation of many miRNAs has been shown to have a role in oncogenesis.  Mir-22 was found to be over-expressed in prostate cancer but down-regulated in breast cancer, cholangiocarcinoma, multiple myeloma and hepatocellular carcinoma. Mir-22 expression was associated with survival in multiple breast cancer datasets.

Targets 
Specifically, miR-22 can function as a tumour suppressor.  One known target is histone deacetylase 4 (HDAC4), which is known to have a critical role in cancer development.  Mir-22 also targets Myc Binding Protein (MYCBP). This prevents transcription of c-Myc target genes by silencing c-MYCBP.  However, c-Myc also inhibits expression of miR-22 in a positive feedback loop.  When this spirals out of control, it can cause uncontrolled cell proliferation.

Possible therapy 
Expression of miR-22 can be induced by adding 12-O-Tetradecanoylphorbol-13-acetate (TPA) to HL-60 cells (leukaemia cell line).  The enforced expression causes the growth of cancer cells to slow down.  This means that miR-22 could be a potential target for cancer therapies.

See also 
 MicroRNA

References

Further reading

External links
 

MicroRNA